The Japanese manga series B Gata H Kei is written and illustrated by Yōko Sanri and is serialized in Shueisha's seinen Weekly Young Jump magazine since 2003. As of August 2010, the serial chapters were collected into eight tankōbon with the first one released on February 18, 2005, and the eighth on July 16, 2010.

Outside Japan, the manga is licensed by Sharp Point Press in Taiwan.



Volumes list

References

B Gata H Kei